Littleborough and Saddleworth was a parliamentary constituency in Greater Manchester, England. It returned one Member of Parliament (MP)  to the House of Commons of the Parliament of the United Kingdom.

The constituency was created for the 1983 general election, and abolished for the 1997 general election.

History
This Conservative-Liberal Democrat marginal was held by the Conservative Party at the three general elections of its existence. The victorious MP on each of these occasions was Geoffrey Dickens, who was elected in 1979 for Huddersfield West (which was a predecessor seat to this constituency, however no part of it was added to this seat when it was created in 1983). However, at a by-election called after Dickens' death in 1995, it was won by Chris Davies of the Liberal Democrats.

Boundaries
1983–1997: The Metropolitan Borough of Oldham wards of Crompton, Lees, Saddleworth East, Saddleworth West, and Shaw, and the Metropolitan Borough of Rochdale wards of Littleborough, Milnrow, and Wardle.

The constituency was centred on the towns of Littleborough, Milnrow and Saddleworth. In 1997, three quarters of the seat became part of the new Oldham East and Saddleworth constituency, with Littleborough and surrounding areas joining the redrawn Rochdale constituency.

Members of Parliament

Elections

Elections in the 1990s

Elections in the 1980s

See also
List of parliamentary constituencies in Greater Manchester

Notes and references

Parliamentary constituencies in North West England (historic)
Politics of the Metropolitan Borough of Rochdale
Politics of the Metropolitan Borough of Oldham
Constituencies of the Parliament of the United Kingdom established in 1983
Constituencies of the Parliament of the United Kingdom disestablished in 1997
Littleborough, Greater Manchester